Antanimasaka may refer to either of the two communes in Madagascar:

 Antanimasaka, Ambatolampy in Ambatolampy District, Vakinankaratra
 Antanimasaka, Marovoay in Marovoay District, Boeny